Hazza is an Arabic-origin masculine given name. People with the name are as follows:

 Hazza' Majali (1917–1960), Jordanian politician
 Hazza Al Mansouri (born 1983), Emirati astronaut
 Hazza bin Sultan Al Nahyan (1905–1958), Emirati royal
 Hazza bin Zayed Al Nahyan (born 1965), Emirati royal and government official
 Hazza Salem (born 1989), Emirati football player
 Hazza Subait (born 2003), Emirati football player

See also
 Hazza (disambiguation)

Arabic masculine given names